Profundiconus smirna, common name the Smirna cone, is a species of sea snail, a marine gastropod mollusk in the family Conidae, the cone snails and their allies.

Like all species within the genus Profundiconus, these cone snails are predatory and venomous. They are capable of "stinging" humans, therefore live ones should be handled carefully or not at all.

Description
The size of the shell varies between 39 mm and 98 mm.

Distribution
This marine species occurs off Southern Japan; off Hawaii, Tonga, Fiji and New Zealand.

References

 Bartsch, P. & Rehder, H. A. 1943. Proc. Biol. Soc. Wash. 56: 87.
 Kosuge S. (1979) Description of a new and rare cones from the Western Pacific (Conidae, Gastropoda). Bulletin of the Institute of Malacology, Tokyo 1(2): 21–22, pl. 4. [30 November 1979] page(s): 21, pl. 4 fig. 10 
 Tucker J.K. & Tenorio M.J. (2009) Systematic classification of Recent and fossil conoidean gastropods. Hackenheim: Conchbooks. 296 pp.
 Monnier E., Limpalaër L., Robin A. & Roux C. (2018). A taxonomic iconography of living Conidae. Harxheim: ConchBooks. 2 vols. 1205 pp.
page(s): 135
 M. Tenorio, Note on Profundiconus smirna with description of a new species : Profundiconus smirnoides n.sp; 	Xenophora Taxonomy N° 7 - Supplément au Xenophora n° 150 - Avril 2015

External links
 The Conus Biodiversity website
 Cone Shells – Knights of the Sea
 

smirna
Gastropods described in 1943